The Flamingos are an American doo-wop group formed in Chicago in 1953. The band became popular in mid-to-late 1950s and are known for their 1959 cover version of "I Only Have Eyes for You". They have since been hailed as one of the finest and most influential vocal groups in pop and doo wop music history. In 2001, the band was inducted into the Rock and Roll Hall of Fame.

The band's cover version of "I Only Have Eyes for You" was ranked number 158 on Rolling Stone magazine's list of the "500 Greatest Songs of All Time".

History

Early quintet
Jacob "Jake" Carey (bass) and Ezekiel "Zeke" Carey (second tenor) formed the group in Chicago, Illinois, United States, after meeting cousins baritone Paul Wilson and first tenor Johnny Carter at a Hebrew Israelite congregation. Earl Lewis (not the Channels lead) soon joined, and after a series of name changes ("The Swallows", "El Flamingos", "The Five Flamingos"), wound up being known as the Flamingos. Sollie McElroy soon replaced Lewis (who joined the Five Echoes). The Flamingos' first single (for Chance Records), "If I Can't Have You", was a moderate local success, as was the follow-up "That's My Desire", but it was Johnny Carter's composition of "Golden Teardrops", with its complex vocal harmonies and Carter's soaring falsetto, that cemented their reputation as a top regional act of the day.

The Flamingos left Chance Records sometime after their December 1953 session, and signed with DJ Al Benson's Parrot Records. Sollie McElroy was on their first Parrot session, but left the group in December 1954, to be replaced by tenor Nate Nelson (who was on their second Parrot session; he's lead on "I'm Yours", released in January 1955). In early 1955, the Flamingos signed with Chess Records, to record for their Checker Records subsidiary. At Chess/Checker, the Flamingos achieved their first national chart hit with "I'll Be Home", which went to number 5 on Billboards R&B chart. Pat Boone's cover version of the song, complete with incorrect lyrics ("My mind's made up" replacing "My time's about up"), was a hit on the pop charts. The group also had moderate success for the label with other chestnuts like "A Kiss from Your Lips", "The Vow" and "Would I Be Crying". The Flamingos also appeared in the 1956 Alan Freed movie Rock, Rock, Rock. Both Zeke Carey and Carter were drafted that year (Carter was drafted in September).

Nate Nelson, Jake Carey and Paul Wilson continued the group with new member Tommy Hunt (added in October 1956). Another new member, tenor/lead, guitarist and arranger, Terry "Buzzy" Johnson, joined in late December 1958. This group (Nate Nelson, Tommy Hunt, Paul Wilson and Jake Carey) began recording for Decca Records in April 1957. Their most notable single was Johnson's arrangement of "The Ladder of Love", but legal entanglements between Checker and Nate Nelson ruined any chance of commercial success. Zeke Carey returned to the Flamingos in 1958, making the group a sextet. (When Johnny Carter was discharged from the service, he joined the Dells, performing with them for almost 50 years until his death in 2009.)

Zeke and Jake Carey were not blood-related, but were considered cousins, because of Zeke being adopted by Jake's aunt and uncle.

End Records
In 1958 the Flamingos began recording for George Goldner's End Records in New York City, where they had several national hits. Almost immediately, the group had their first pop chart hit with "Lovers Never Say Goodbye", written by Terry Johnson, who shared lead chores on the song with Paul Wilson. The formula was a winner as Johnson and Wilson  also led three of the 12 songs selected for their first album Flamingo SerenadeGeorge Gershwin's "Love Walked In", "But Not for Me" and "Time Was". The Flamingos would have their biggest seller in 1959 with another old standard from that LP, on which Nate Nelson handled lead vocals. "I Only Have Eyes for You" (written in 1934 by composer Harry Warren and lyricist Al Dubin for the film Dames) became their biggest seller, and has been featured in dozens of movies and TV shows. A long series of hits followed, including the Johnson-penned "Mio Amore", Doc Pomus' composition "Your Other Love", "Nobody Loves Me Like You" (written for the group by Sam Cooke), and "I Was Such a Fool". LP cuts "Love Walked In" and "Time Was" were also issued as singles.  That same year, they appeared in the Alan Freed movie, Go, Johnny, Go, singing a frenetic version of "Jump Children" (originally recorded for Chance Records in the early days). The group became known almost as much for their stage show and choreography as for their harmonies. Groups including the Temptations and the Tavares would later credit the group as major influences.

Splintering
The group began to come apart at the turn of the decade. Tommy Hunt left for a solo career in 1960. Nate Nelson and Terry Johnson split to form the "Modern Flamingos" in 1961, and went on to record as the Starglows on Atco Records in 1963. (The Modern Flamingos name was used later; the group would include members of the defunct Del-Knights in the late 1960s). New members were brought in, making the group Zeke Carey (tenor), Jake Carey (bass), Paul Wilson (baritone), Billy Clarke (tenor), Eddie Williams (tenor), Alan Fontaine (guitar), and Julien Vaught (saxophone). Also Johnny Carter left in 1960 to join the Dells. Clarke and Williams took duties on most new lead vocals.

A sixth vocalist, Doug McClure, was added in 1962. Shortly afterwards, Clarke and Williams left the group. Founding member Paul Wilson left in 1964, new member Sidney Hall joined in 1966, and Jacob Carey's son J.C. Carey joined in 1969. They recorded several uptempo songs through the 1960s, peaking at number 26 in the UK Singles Chart with "The Boogaloo Party". Around this time, the Flamingos formed their own label, Ronze, and produced many of their own recordings.

The group continued recording into the 1970s. A new album was released in 1972 on Ronze, entitled The Flamingos Today. By this time, the group was the Careys, McClure, Fontaine, the returning Billy Clarke, and former Limelite Clarence Bassett, Jr. New member Frank "Mingo" Ayers joined soon after. More mildly successful recordings came in this decade, including the uptempo "Heavy Hips", and "Buffalo Soldier".

By 1980, the group was Jake Carey, Zeke Carey, Frank Ayers and Jerome Wilson. Ayers left around this time, joining the Del Vikings. In 1984, two new members joined: Bennie Cherry and Archie Satterfield. In 1988, the group was featured at the 1988 Grammy Awards.

By the early 1990s, the group was the Careys, Satterfield, Ron Reace and Kenny Davis. Later, it was the Careys, Reace, and King Raymond Green. Jake Carey died in 1997. The group recorded a new album, Unspoken Emotions, under the Ronze label in 1999. It featuring re-recordings of "Ain't Nothing But A Party" and "I'll Be Home", led by Zeke Carey. The group appeared on the PBS television special Doo Wop 50 that same year. The lineup was Zeke Carey, J.C. Carey, Ron Reace, King Raymond Green, and Larry Jordan. Zeke Carey died on December 24, 1999. King Raymond Green and Ron Reace left around that time and were replaced by Earnest "Just Mike" Gilbert and former Dynamic Superior George Spann. James Faison entered shortly thereafter. Tommy Hunt has flown in from England (where he has lived since 1970) to perform with this group twice since 2001.

The group split up in late 2005 due to money disputes. Spann, Jordan, Gilbert, and Faison grouped together to reform Spann's old group, The Dynamic Superiors. J.C. Carey brought in new members, and toured with Tommy Hunt starting in April 2007.

Terry Johnson is the owner of the "Flamingos" federal trademark and leads the current incarnation of the group. The current lineup is Johnson, Starling Newsome, Stan Prinston and musical director Theresa Trigg. The Flamingos featuring Terry Johnson appeared on two PBS specials: Rock and Roll at Fifty (in which they were the only group to have more than two songs featured) and Doo Wop Cavalcade: The Definitive Anthology. In 2013, the Flamingos released the Diamond Anniversary Tour CD. They continue to perform in  concerts across the country.

Pepsi lawsuit
J. C. Carey, Jr., Terry Johnson, Tommy Hunt and descendants of Nate Nelson and Paul Wilson sued PepsiCo for having used "I Only Have Eyes For You" in a 1998 television commercial, allegedly without having consulted the group. The group was awarded $250,000.

Awards
The Flamingos received the Rhythm & Blues Foundation Pioneer Award in 1996 (where Terry Johnson, Jake Carey, Zeke Carey, Tommy Hunt and Johnny Carter performed) and were inducted into the Vocal Group Hall of Fame in 2000, the Rock and Roll Hall of Fame in 2001, and the Doo-Wopp Hall of Fame in 2004. The group that performed at the Rock Hall ceremony included Terry Johnson on lead, Tommy Hunt and Johnny Carter. In 2003, the Flamingos' recording of "I Only Have Eyes For You", co-written by Walle (Walter) Dillard, was inducted into the Grammy Award Hall of Fame.

Singles

References

External links

'The Flamingos' Vocal Group Hall of Fame Page
'The Flamingos' Rock and Roll Hall of Fame Page
Doo-Wopp Hall of Fame

Discography
Marv Goldberg article of the Del-Knights

Musical groups established in 1953
Doo-wop groups
African-American musical groups
Vee-Jay Records artists
Parrot Records (blues label) artists
Articles containing video clips